Events from the year 1457 in England.

Incumbents
 Monarch – Henry VI
 Lord Chancellor – William Waynflete
 Lord Privy Seal – Lawrence Booth

Events
 1 January – Osmund of Salisbury (died 1099) is canonised, the last English saint created until the 20th century. His remains are translated from Old Sarum to Salisbury Cathedral on 23 July.
 28 January – Margaret Beaufort gives birth to Henry Tudor the future King at Pembroke Castle in Wales
 28 August – French under Pierre de Brézé raiders sack Sandwich, Kent.
 Unknown – Robert Sturmy sails from Bristol on his unsuccessful attempt to break the Italian monopoly on trade in the Eastern Mediterranean

Births
 28 January – King Henry VII of England (died 1509)
 George Nevill, Duke of Bedford (died 1483)
 Thomas West, 8th Baron De La Warr (died 1525)

Deaths
 Robert Neville, bishop (born 1404)

References

 
Years of the 15th century in England